Saturday's Children is a 1929 American part-talkie romantic-comedy film directed by Gregory La Cava, and starring Corinne Griffith, Grant Withers, Albert Conti, Alma Tell, Lucien Littlefield. It is based on the 1927 play Saturday's Children by Maxwell Anderson. The film was released by Warner Bros. on March 10, 1929 in silent version and April 14, 1929 in sound version.

Cast
Corinne Griffith as Bobby Halevy
Grant Withers as Rims Rosson
Albert Conti as Mengle
Alma Tell as Florrie
Lucien Littlefield as Willie
Charles Willis Lane as Mr. Henry Halevy
Anne Schaefer as Mrs. Halevy
Marcia Harris as Mrs. Gorlick

Preservation
The film is now considered lost.

References

External links

1929 romantic comedy films
American romantic comedy films
1929 films
American black-and-white films
Warner Bros. films
Transitional sound films
Lost American films
American films based on plays
1929 lost films
Films directed by Gregory La Cava
1920s English-language films
1920s American films